Helen Putnam Regional Park is a regional park southwest of Petaluma, California, which is maintained by the Sonoma County Regional Parks Department. The park entrance is at 411 Chileno Valley Road.

History
The park is named after Helen Putnam, a former teacher who was the first female mayor of Petaluma, serving from 1966 to 1978, and the second female member of the Sonoma County Board of Supervisors.

The park's official dedication took place in 1985.

Facilities and features
The park features numerous trails suitable for hiking, bicycling, and horseback riding. The trails include a segment of the Bay Area Ridge Trail.

The parking lot has 37 spaces, including spaces for handicapped and equestrian users. There is a gazebo, a picnic area, and a children's playground near the parking area, and a pond stocked with bluegill.

References

External links

County parks in California
Parks in Sonoma County, California
Regional parks in California
Protected areas established in 1985
Bay Area Ridge Trail
1985 establishments in California